John Langston may refer to:
 John Mercer Langston (1829–1897), American abolitionist, attorney, educator, activist, diplomat, and politician, first dean of the law school at Howard University
 John Langston (MP) (–1812), English merchant banker and politician, Member of Parliament (MP) 1784–1807

See also
 John Lankston, American tenor